Over time Joseph Stalin resided in various places.
Stalin's house, Gori, Georgia, his birthplace and now a museum
Tiflis Spiritual Seminary
Kureika house, Siberia, where Stalin spent his final exile in 1914–1916.
 Stalin's apartment in Moscow Kremlin

Dachas

At various times Stalin used about 20 dachas.

Dachas in Moscow area:
 Kuntsevo Dacha ("Near Dacha")
 Uspenskoye Dacha (Far Dacha, old)
 Semyonovskoye Dacha (Far Dacha, new)
 Zubalovo dacha, the first one; not preserved 
 Lipki dacha; not preserved

Elsewhere in Russia:
Sochi Dacha (Matsesta dacha)
Malaya Sosnovka, Perm krai
 Bolshiye Brody dacha, Valday, Novgorod Oblast

There were 5 Stalin's dachas in Abkhazia
 New Athos Dacha
 Kholodnaya Rechka Dacha
 Lake Ritsa Dacha
 Sukhumi Dacha, amid the Sukhumi arboretum (now part of the Sukhumi botanical garden)
 Miusera dacha

He also used to stay in other state residences, such as Livadia Palace, Crimea or Massandra Palace, Crimea. Alternatively, many of Stalin's dachas were used for state functions, by other high ranking Soviet officials, and by foreign guests.

References

Places associated with Joseph Stalin